Herminia Arrate Ramírez (July 1, 1895 – March 12, 1941) was a painter and First Lady of Chile as wife of President Carlos Dávila Espinoza.

Biography
She was born in Santiago, Chile, daughter of Colonel Miguel Arrate Larraín and Delia Ramírez Molina, and granddaughter of Eleuterio Ramírez, a Pacific War hero (Tarapacá's campaign). Since her childhood, she had been interested in the arts, especially painting, being a disciple of Fernando Álvarez de Sotomayor and Pablo Burchard. In 1927, she traveled to Europe. She married Carlos Dávila Espinoza, a journalist, ambassador and President of Chile in 1932. She died in Santiago in 1941.

External links
 
Herminia Arrate's biography 

1895 births
1941 deaths
First ladies of Chile
People from Santiago
Chilean women painters
20th-century Chilean painters
20th-century Chilean women artists
Arrate